Titanic 666 (also known as Titanic 3) is a 2022 American supernatural horror film directed by Nick Lyon and produced by The Asylum. It is a sequel to Titanic II (2010) and stars Jamie Bamber and Keesha Sharp. It was released on Tubi on the United States on April 15, 2022, on the 110th anniversary of the sinking of the Titanic. The film received generally unfavorable reviews, and users on social media noted the film's similarity to Titanic (1997) and Studio 666 (2022).

Synopsis
After embarking on the maiden voyage of Titanic 3, a group of digital influencers are surrounded by macabre events.

Cast
Keesha Sharp as Captain Celeste Rhoades
Jamie Bamber as Professor Hal Cochran
Lydia Hearst as Idina Bess, who is revealed to be the great-granddaughter of Captain Edward Smith
AnnaLynne McCord as Mia Stone
Joseph Gatt as Brian Andrews

Reception
Waldemar Dalenogare Neto evaluated it with a score of 1/10 and said that "whoever sees it, does not believe it: The Asylum managed to overcome itself (...) I already knew it was a bad movie, the trailer is already a disgrace (...) the bad taste when dealing with a tragedy (on the anniversary of the sinking of the Titanic) (...) It's not a horror movie, as much as the title may lead you to this idea, here you actually have a big joke at the cost of extremely poor graphical effects and a completely lost cast."

In his review in Paste magazine, Matt Donato rated it 4/10 saying that "while Netflix harbors Oscar aspirations for its originals, Tubi appears content being the streaming equivalent of SYFY after midnight. (...) I’ve seen worse films this year than Titanic 666, but also too many better examples (...) Against all odds, Titanic 666 is too dramatic and straight-faced for its own good."

On Crooked Marquee, Josh Bell rated it a "C-" saying that "is a slow, dull haunted-ship story that takes far too long to get to its meager terrors. Lydia Hearst finds the right campy tone as a descendant of one of the original Titanic victims who summons their spirits to curse this shameless exploitation of their memories, and AnnaLynne McCord is fun to watch as a narcissistic influencer who exits the movie too early. But the ghosts themselves are tame, poorly rendered apparitions, and the valiant, self-sacrificing captain (Keesha Sharp) makes for a weak protagonist as the voyage predictably devolves into chaos."

References

External links 
 
 Titanic 666 at Rotten Tomatoes

2022 films
2022 horror films
American independent films
2020s English-language films
Mockbuster films
2020s satirical films
Films about social media
2022 independent films
Films directed by Nick Lyon
2020s American films
The Asylum films